John Cozens may refer to:

 John Cozens (footballer), former English footballer
 John Cozens (musician), Canadian arts administrator, arranger, choir conductor, and tenor
 John Robert Cozens, British draftsman and painter